Andreas "Andy" Jung (born 1 August 1961) is a Swiss modern pentathlete. He competed at the 1984 and 1988 Summer Olympics.

References

External links
 

1961 births
Living people
Swiss male modern pentathletes
Olympic modern pentathletes of Switzerland
Modern pentathletes at the 1984 Summer Olympics
Modern pentathletes at the 1988 Summer Olympics